List of suicide attacks may refer to:

List of suicide attacks in Turkey
List of Palestinian suicide attacks